Myechyslaw Ivanavich Hryb (born 25 September 1938) is a Belarusian politician who was the eleventh Chairman of the Supreme Soviet of Belarus from 28 January 1994 to 10 January 1996. In his capacity as the head of state, Hryb adopted the first Constitution of Belarus. He succeeded Stanislav Shushkevich and was head of state from 28 January to 20 July 1994 until Alexander Lukashenko replaced him in the new office called President of Belarus, which became the new head of state office. He continued as a parliamentary speaker. Hryb is now a politician in the opposition and a member of the Social-Democratic Party.

In October 2020, Hryb was appointed by opposition leader Sviatlana Tsikhanouskaya to a Public Constitutional Commission as its Chairman, tasked with proposing democratic reforms to the Constitution of Belarus. This opposition panel is not recognized by the government of Alexander Lukashenko.

Notes

References

External links 

1938 births
Living people
People from Dzyatlava District
People from Nowogródek Voivodeship (1919–1939)
Presidents of Belarus
Members of the Supreme Council of Belarus
Communist Party of Byelorussia politicians
Members of the National Assembly of Belarus
Belarusian Social Democratic Party (Assembly) politicians
Belarusian State University alumni